St. Clara is an unincorporated community in central Doddridge County, West Virginia, United States. Its elevation is 850 feet (254 m).

An early postmaster gave the community the name of his wife, Clara DisDebar. Located at St. Clara is the Gamsjager-Wysong Farm, listed on the National Register of Historic Places in 1986.

References

Unincorporated communities in Doddridge County, West Virginia
Unincorporated communities in West Virginia